The 6th parallel north is a circle of latitude that is 6 degrees north of the Earth's equatorial plane. It crosses Africa, the Indian Ocean, Southeast Asia, the Pacific Ocean, South America and the Atlantic Ocean.

Around the world
Starting at the Prime Meridian and heading eastwards, the parallel 6° north passes through:

{| class="wikitable plainrowheaders"
! scope="col" | Co-ordinates
! scope="col" | Country, territory or sea
! scope="col" | Notes
|-
| 
! scope="row" | 
|
|-
| style="background:#b0e0e6;" | 
! scope="row" style="background:#b0e0e6;" | Atlantic Ocean
| style="background:#b0e0e6;" | Bight of Benin - passing just south of Lomé, 
|-
| 
! scope="row" | 
|
|-
| 
! scope="row" | 
|
|-
| 
! scope="row" | 
|
|-
| 
! scope="row" | 
| 
|-
| 
! scope="row" | 
|
|-
| 
! scope="row" | 
|
|-
| style="background:#b0e0e6;" | 
! scope="row" style="background:#b0e0e6;" | Indian Ocean
| style="background:#b0e0e6;" |
|-
| 
! scope="row" | 
| Passing through Shaviyani Atoll
|-
| style="background:#b0e0e6;" | 
! scope="row" style="background:#b0e0e6;" | Indian Ocean
| style="background:#b0e0e6;" |
|-
| 
! scope="row" | 
|
|-
| style="background:#b0e0e6;" | 
! scope="row" style="background:#b0e0e6;" | Indian Ocean
| style="background:#b0e0e6;" | Passing just north of Weh Island, 
Passing just south of Indira Point, Great Nicobar, 
|-
| 
! scope="row" | 
|Kedah on Peninsular Malaysia
|-
| 
! scope="row" | 
|Yala and Narathiwat provinces
|-
| 
! scope="row" | 
|Kelantan on Peninsular Malaysia
|-
| style="background:#b0e0e6;" | 
! scope="row" style="background:#b0e0e6;" | South China Sea
| style="background:#b0e0e6;" |
|-
| 
! scope="row" | 
| Sabah - islands of Pulau Gaya and Borneo
|-
| style="background:#b0e0e6;" | 
! scope="row" style="background:#b0e0e6;" | Labuk Bay
| style="background:#b0e0e6;" |
|-
| 
! scope="row" | 
| Sabah - island of Borneo
|-
| style="background:#b0e0e6;" | 
! scope="row" style="background:#b0e0e6;" | Sulu Sea
| style="background:#b0e0e6;" | Passing between islands in the Sulu Archipelago, 
|-
| 
! scope="row" | 
| Islands of Jolo and Balanguingui
|-
| style="background:#b0e0e6;" | 
! scope="row" style="background:#b0e0e6;" | Celebes Sea
| style="background:#b0e0e6;" | Passing just south of the island of Tongquil, 
|-
| 
! scope="row" | 
| Island of Mindanao
|-
| style="background:#b0e0e6;" | 
! scope="row" style="background:#b0e0e6;" | Sarangani Bay
| style="background:#b0e0e6;" |
|-
| 
! scope="row" | 
| Island of Mindanao
|-valign="top"
| style="background:#b0e0e6;" | 
! scope="row" style="background:#b0e0e6;" | Pacific Ocean
| style="background:#b0e0e6;" | Passing just north of Namoluk atoll, Passing just north of Ngatik atoll, Passing just south of Pingelap atoll, 
|-
| 
! scope="row" | 
| Jaluit Atoll
|-
| style="background:#b0e0e6;" | 
! scope="row" style="background:#b0e0e6;" | Pacific Ocean
| style="background:#b0e0e6;" |
|-
| 
! scope="row" | 
| Mili Atoll
|-valign="top"
| style="background:#b0e0e6;" | 
! scope="row" style="background:#b0e0e6;" | Pacific Ocean
| style="background:#b0e0e6;" | Passing just north of Palmyra Atoll, 
|-
| 
! scope="row" | 
|
|-
| 
! scope="row" | 
|
|-
| 
! scope="row" | Disputed area
|-
| 
! scope="row" | 
|
|-
| style="background:#b0e0e6;" | 
! scope="row" style="background:#b0e0e6;" | Atlantic Ocean
| style="background:#b0e0e6;" |
|-
| 
! scope="row" | 
| Northernmost point - for about 3 km
|-
| style="background:#b0e0e6;" | 
! scope="row" style="background:#b0e0e6;" | Atlantic Ocean
| style="background:#b0e0e6;" |
|-
| 
! scope="row" | 
|
|-
| 
! scope="row" | 
|
|-
| 
! scope="row" | 
|
|}

See also
5th parallel north
7th parallel north

n06